Prof. Yair Galily (Hebrew: יאיר גלילי, born July 10, 1970) is a behavioural scientist, head of the Sport, Media and Society (SMS) Research Lab at the Sammy Ofer School of Communications and a senior researcher at the International Institute for Counter-Terrorism (ICT) at Reichman University (IDC). 

Thus far (2022), has written and edited  7 books and more than 160 peer-reviewed articles in international academic journals in various fields related to behavioral and social aspects of sports and exercise. His research on the "Choking under pressure" phenomenon of NBA players (2018) gained worldwide resonance, including in the New Yorker and the World Economic Forum. His research on the media power and social activism of basketball player LeBron James, alongside "Artificial Intelligence and sports Journalism" (2019), is gaining similar reverberation. He is the founder and head of the research unit at the Israeli Football Association and member of the Union of European Football Associations’ (UEFA) club licensing committee. Lieutenant Colonel (Res.) Galily serves as chief (Organizational and Instructional) Behavioural Scientist of the Israel Defense Forces Combat Fitness Centre.

Biography 

Born and raised in Petah Tikva, Israel, Galily graduated (M.Sc.) from Clark University (Worcester, MA, USA) in 1996 and wrote his doctorate (Ph.D.), under the supervision of Ken Sheard and Eric Dunning, at the Centre for Research into Sport and Society in Leicester University (UK, 2001). 
Dr. Galily is the founder and head of the research unit at the Israeli Football Association; Member of UEFA club licensing committee and board member of the Israeli Communications Association.

Major Work 

Galily is considered, along with Amir Ben-Porat, to a pioneer in the field of sport sociology in Israel. His text-book (with Ben-Porat and Ronnie Lidor) Introduction to Sport and Society (Open University Press, 2010) and Sport, Politics and Society in the Land of Israel (Routledage, 2007) considered the first -ever comprehensive texts on sport sociology from an Israeli perspective.

In recent years Galily have guest-edited few leading international journals, among them American Behavioural Scientist (Sage, 2016), Television & New Media, (Sage, 2015) and Online Information Review (Emerald, 2016). In 2018, Galily published, along with his post-doctoral student Elia Morgulev,  Frontiers in Psychology,'s  paper entitled "Choking or Delivering Under Pressure? The Case of Elimination Games in NBA Playoffs" which was largely discussed at both the New Yorker and t he World Economic Forum.

In April 2021 his book "The Psychology of Sport, Performance And Ethics" was published in Lausanne by Frontiers Media SA. [doi: 10.3389/978-2-88966-679-9].

In January 2023 his edited collection "The Munich Massacre Contemporary Thoughts and Views on Sport and Terrorism from a Global Perspective" was published by Taylor and Francis.

Career 

Galily is Founder & Head of the Sport, Media and Society (SMS) Research Lab at the Sammy Ofer School of Communications Interdisciplinary Center (IDC) Herzliya. He was a co-founder and head of the Olympic Studies Centre - a joint venture of the Israeli Olympic committee and Zinman College, Wingate Institute. (2011 – 2013). Served as the professional committee chairman and member of the `Academic Sport Association`(ASA) board of directors 2002–2003, 2005–2008 and professional committee member at 'Special Olympics Israel' which is part of the Special Olympics International nonprofit organisation dedicated to empowering individuals with intellectual disabilities to become physically fit, productive and respected members of society through year round sports training and competitions. Prof. Galily is being interviewed regularly by both Israeli and international media regarding social processes surrounding sporting activities in Israel and around the world.

Further reading 
A list of Galily's publications (all full text) can be found at

https://www.researchgate.net/profile/Yair_Galily/contributions

Google Scholar Citations:

https://scholar.google.co.il/citations?user=P2_Y-RsAAAAJ&hl=en

References 
IDC School of Communications: http://portal.idc.ac.il/sites/communications_new/he/communications/pages/default.aspx

The Interdisciplinary Center, Herzliya: http://portal.idc.ac.il/he/main/homepage/pages/homepage.aspx

Y Galily's homepage at http://web.macam.ac.il/~galiliy/ (old site)

External links 
 https://web.archive.org/web/20120402141715/http://sports.il.msn.com/football/gallery.aspx?cp-documentid=155975496&page=6
 http://pubget.com/search?q=authors%3A%22Yair%20Galily%22

1970 births
Living people
People from Petah Tikva
Israeli sociologists
Academic staff of Wingate Institute
Clark University alumni
Alumni of the University of Leicester
Textbook writers